This is a list of bishops of Lleida.

Itxió 203
Sant Filó 227
Joan 230
Pere 258
Màrius Seli 259
Sant Lleir 268–311
Diperdió 313
Amili 380
Prudenci 400
Atanasi 413
Saguici 413
Jacobo 419
Seberí 460
Fortunat 517
Pere 519
Andreu 540
Februari 546
Polibi 589
Julià 592
Ameli 599
Gomarelo 614
Fructuós 633
Gandeleno 653
Eusendo 683
Esteve 714
Sant Medard 788
Jacobo 842
Adulfo 887–922
Atón 923–955
Odisendo 955–975
Aimerico 988–991
Jacobo 996
Aimerico II 1006–1015
Borrell 1017–1019
Arnulfo 1023–1067
Salomó, osb 1068–1075
Arnulfo II 1075–1076
Pere Raimund Dalmaci 1076–1094
Lupo 1094–1097
Ponç, osb 1097–1104
Sant Ramon II 1104–1126
Esteve 1126
Pere Guillem, osb 1126–1134
Ramir, osb 1134
Gaufrid, osb 1135–1143
Guillem Pérez de Ravitats 1776
Guillem Berenguer 1177–1190
Gombau de Camporrells 1191–1205
Berenguer de Eril 1205–1235
Pere de Albalate 1236–1238
Raimund de Siscar, oc 1238–1247
Guillem de Barberà, oc 1248–1255
Berenguer de Peralta, op 1256
Guillem de Moncad 1257–1278
G. Bernáldez de Fluviá 1282–1286
Gerald de Andria 1290–1298
Pere del Rei 1299–1308
Ponce de Aguinaliu 1308–1313
Guillem de Aranyó, op 1314–1321
Ponç de Villamur 1322–1324
Raimund de Avignó 1324–1327
Arnau de Cescomes 1327–1334
Ferrer de Colom 1334-1240
Jaume Sitjó 1341–1348
Esteve Mulceo 1348–1360
Romeo de Cescomes 1361–1380
Raimund 1380–1386
Gerard de Requesens 1387–1399
Pere de San Clemente 1399–1403
Joan Bauphes 1403
Pere Zagarriga 1404–1407
Pere de Cardona 1407–1411
Domingo Ram 1415–1434
García Aznárez de Añón 1435–1449
Antoni Cerdà 1449–1459
Lluís Joan de Milá 1461–1510
Joan de Enguera 1510–1516
Jaume Conchillos, om 1512–1542
Martí Valero 1542
Ferran Loaces 1543–1553
Joan Arias 1553–1554
Miquel Despuig 1556–1559
Antoni Agustín 1561–1576
M. Thomas de Taxaquet 1577–1578
Carles Doménech 1580–1581
Benito Toco, osb 1583–1585
Gaspar Joan de la Figuera 1585–1586
Joan Martínez de Villatoriel 1586–1591
Pere de Aragón 1592–1597
Francesc Virgili 1599–1620
Pere Antón Serra 1621–1633
Antoni Pérez, osb 1633
Pere  de Magarola 1634
B.Caballero de Paredes 1635–1642
Pere de Santiago, osa. 1644–1650
Miquel de Escartín 1656–1664
Braulio Sunyer 1664–1667
Josep Ninot 1668–1673
Jaume Copons 1673–1680
Francesc Berardo 1680–1681
Miquel Jeroni de Molina 1682–1698
Joan de Santa M. Alonso 1699–1700
Fr. de Solís, om 1701–1714
Francesc Olasso Hipenza 1714–1735
Gregorio Galindo 1736–1756
Manel Macías Pedrejón 1757–1770
J.A.Sánchez Ferragudo 1771–1783
Jeroni M. de Torres 1783–1816
Manel de Villar 1816–1817
Remigi Lasanta Ortega 1818
Pau Colmenares, Bishop of Lleida, Catalonia [1824–1832]
Simó A.de Rentería Reyes 1819–1824
Pau Colmenares, osb 1824–1832
Julià Alonso i Vecino 1833–1844
Josep D.Costa i Borràs 1848–1850
Pere Cirilo Uriz i Labaury 1850–1861
Marià Puigllat i Amigó 1861–1870
Tomàs Costa i Fornaguera 1875–1889
Josep Meseguer i Costa 1889–1905
Joan A.Ruano i Martín 1905–1914
Josep Miralles Sbert 1914–1925
Manuel Irurita Almándoz 1926–1930
Salvi Huix Miralpeix 1935–1936
Manuel Moll i Salord aa 1938–1943
Joan Villar i Sanz 1943–1947
Aurelio del Pino Gómez 1947–1967
Ramon Malla Call 1968–1999
Francesc Xavier Ciuraneta Aymí 1999–2007
Juan Piris Frigola since 2008

See also
 Timeline of Lleida

References

Lleida
Religion in Lleida
Lleida
Lleida